Archips negundana, the larger boxelder leafroller, is a moth of the family Tortricidae. The species was first described by Harrison Gray Dyar Jr. in 1902. It is found in North America from southern British Columbia to southern Quebec, south to California and Florida.

The wingspan is 18–21 mm. Adults are on wing in July.

The larvae feed on Acer negundo, nettle Urtica, and honeysuckle Lonicera.

External links
 
 

Archips
Moths described in 1902
Moths of North America